Aygun Girkhlarova (born 21 September 1983) is an Azerbaijani former footballer who played as a forward. She has been a member of the Azerbaijan women's national team.

See also
List of Azerbaijan women's international footballers

References

1983 births
Living people
Women's association football forwards
Azerbaijani women's footballers
Azerbaijan women's international footballers